National Highway 205A, commonly referred to as NH 205A, is a national highway in  India. It is a spur road of National Highway 5. NH-205A traverses the state of Punjab in India.

Route 
Kharar - Banur - Tepla.

Junctions  

  Terminal near Kharar.
                          

Terminal near Banur.:      Terminal near Tepla.

See also 

 List of National Highways in India
 List of National Highways in India by state

References

External links 

 NH 205A on OpenStreetMap

National highways in India
National Highways in Punjab, India